Sovran is Draconian's sixth studio album released October 30, 2015, through Napalm Records. It's the first album with new singer Heike Langhans (:LOR3L3I:, ISON) after the departure of Lisa Johansson in 2011. It's also the last album to feature bassist Fredrik Johansson, who left the band in April, 2016.

A music video for "Stellar Tombs" was released on January 29, 2016.

Track listing

Personnel
Heike Langhans - vocals
Anders Jacobsson - vocals
Johan Ericson - lead guitar, backing vocals
Daniel Arvidsson - rhythm guitar
Fredrik Johansson - bass
Jerry Torstensson - drums, percussion
Daniel Änghede (of Crippled Black Phoenix) - Clean vocals on "Rivers Between Us".

Production
Arranged and produced by Johan Ericson and Draconian, co-produced by David Castillo and Jakob Hermann.

References

External links
Draconian reveals new album "Sovran"
"Sovran" at Napalm Records

2015 albums
Draconian (band) albums
Napalm Records albums